The Infant Life (Preservation) Act 1929 is an Act of the Parliament of the United Kingdom. It created the offence of child destruction. The Act retains three sections, the most substantive legal changes of which are in the first section.

The Bill preceding it was introduced as the Child Destruction Bill. It was reintroduced in the next session as the Preservation of Infant Life Bill.

Section 1(1)'s caveat of the Act amended s.58 of the Offences against the Person Act 1861 so that abortions and child destruction carried out in good faith for the sole purpose of preserving the life of the mother were no longer an offence.

Relationship with the Abortion Act 1967
The Abortion Act 1967 makes foetal abortion legal in specific circumstances when conducted in accordance with the regulations of the act.

The 1967 Act—as for added clarity amended by s37 of the Human Fertilisation and Embryology Act 1990—explicitly notes that abortions performed under the terms of the 1967 Act are not offences under the 1929 Act.

No offence under the Infant Life (Preservation) Act 1929 shall be committed by a registered medical practitioner who terminates a pregnancy in accordance with the provisions of this Act [the Abortion Act].

References

External links

Parliamentary debates
http://hansard.millbanksystems.com/lords/1928/nov/14/preservation-of-infant-life-bill-hl
http://hansard.millbanksystems.com/lords/1928/nov/22/preservation-of-infant-life-bill-hl
http://hansard.millbanksystems.com/lords/1928/dec/06/preservation-of-infant-life-bill-hl
http://hansard.millbanksystems.com/lords/1928/dec/18/preservation-of-infant-life-bill-hl
http://hansard.millbanksystems.com/commons/1929/jan/28/preservation-of-infant-life-bill-lords
http://hansard.millbanksystems.com/commons/1929/mar/25/preservation-of-infant-life-bill-lords
http://hansard.millbanksystems.com/commons/1929/apr/18/standing-committee-a
http://hansard.millbanksystems.com/commons/1929/apr/23/chairmens-panel
http://hansard.millbanksystems.com/commons/1929/apr/23/standing-committee-a
http://hansard.millbanksystems.com/commons/1929/apr/24/standing-committee-a
http://hansard.millbanksystems.com/commons/1929/apr/25/preservation-of-infant-life-bill-lords
http://hansard.millbanksystems.com/commons/1929/apr/25/infant-life-preservation-bill-lords
http://hansard.millbanksystems.com/commons/1929/may/02/infant-life-preservation-bill-lords
http://hansard.millbanksystems.com/lords/1929/may/07/preservation-of-infant-life-bill-hl
http://hansard.millbanksystems.com/lords/1929/may/08/preservation-of-infant-life-bill-hl
http://hansard.millbanksystems.com/commons/1929/may/09/message-from-the-lords
http://hansard.millbanksystems.com/commons/1929/may/10/royal-assent

Acts of the Parliament of the United Kingdom concerning England and Wales
English criminal law
United Kingdom abortion law
United Kingdom Acts of Parliament 1929